Gibbs Stadium is a 13,000-seat multi-purpose stadium in Spartanburg, South Carolina. It opened in 1996 and is home to the Wofford College Terriers football team. It is also formerly the home to the Spartanburg High School varsity football team. It was named for the Gibbs family, long-time donors to Wofford, for their $1 million donation to build it.

See also
 List of NCAA Division I FCS football stadiums

References

External links
Gibbs Stadium at Wofford Athletics

College football venues
Sports venues in South Carolina
Wofford Terriers football
Multi-purpose stadiums in the United States
Sports venues in Spartanburg County, South Carolina
Buildings and structures in Spartanburg, South Carolina